Gianpaolo Bellini (born 27 March 1980) is an Italian former professional footballer who played as a defender. Bellini is a one-club man; he spent his entire professional career with Atalanta, and currently holds the record for the most appearances in the club's history (435). His primary position was left-back, but he was also capable of playing on the right flank and as a central defender.

Club career
Born in Sarnico, Province of Bergamo, Bellini played his first league match on 11 April 1999 for Atalanta, at that time in Serie B.

In the 2009–10 season, Bellini played as left-back, while Thomas Manfredini, Paolo Bianco, Leonardo Talamonti were used as central-defenders. On 26 July 2010, he and Manfredini signed a new 3+1 year contract with the club.

On 8 May 2016, Bellini scored in his final game, a 1–1 Serie A draw against Udinese at the Stadio di Bergamo. He retired having made a record 435 appearances for Atalanta, 279 of which were in the Serie A.

International career
Along with Cesare Natali, his teammate at Atalanta, Bellini was called up to the Italy under-21 side for the 2002 UEFA European Under-21 Football Championship. They partnered in 2 matches at the tournament as Italy reached the semi-finals.

Managerial career
In 2017, Bellini was named assistant head coach of Atalanta's Primavera (under-21) team. After five years as a deputy to Massimo Brambilla, in 2022, Bellini was appointed head coach of Atalanta's under-17 team.

Honours
Atalanta
Serie B: 2005–06, 2010–11

References

External links
 Atalanta B.C. Official Player Profile 
 Gianpaolo Bellini National Team Stats at FIGC.it 

Italian footballers
Italy under-21 international footballers
Atalanta B.C. players
Serie A players
Serie B players
Association football defenders
Sportspeople from the Province of Bergamo
1980 births
Living people
Footballers from Lombardy